Robert of Dramelay (died before 1280) was the second Baron of Chalandritsa in the Principality of Achaea in Frankish Greece from ca. 1230 until his death, some time before 1280.

He was succeeded by his son Guy II of Dramelay.

References
 

13th-century births
1270s deaths
13th-century rulers in Europe
Barons of the Principality of Achaea
Medieval Achaea